X Factor is a Danish television music competition to find new singing talent. The eighth season premiered on 2 January 2015 and ended on 27 March on DR1. Eva Harlou returned as host for her second season. Thomas Blachman, Remee and Lina Rafn returned as judges for their respective seventh, fifth and fourth seasons.

Judges and hosts

On 29 March 2014 Remee announced that he would not be returning as a judge for season 8. On 11 August it was announced that Eva Harlou would be returning as host. On 18 August it was announced that Thomas Blachman, Lina Rafn and Remee would all be returning as judges for season 8.

Selection process

Auditions
Auditions took place in Copenhagen and Aarhus.

5 Chair Challenge
For the eighth season, superbootcamp was replaced by 5 Chair Challenge. 5 Chair Challenge was filmed from 28 to 29 October 2014. The 14-22s category was changed to the 15-22s. Remee received the 15-22s category, Rafn received the Over 23s and Blachman received the Groups. Before the Groups were due to perform, Blachman removed two of the chairs.

The 15 successful acts were:
15-22s: Baraa, Daniel, Emilie, Johannes, Tannaz
Over 23s: Jògvan, Nanni, Peter, Rene, Sophia
Groups: The CCS, Citybois, Finn & Rie, Ivarsson, Bang & Neumann, Second Venue

Bootcamp
Remee took the 15-22s to a military base; Rafn took the Over 23s to Horsens Statsfængsel; and Blachman took the Groups to a school. For the first time since the show's inception in 2008, the judges had no assistants.

The 6 eliminated acts were:
15-22s: Daniel, Johannes
Over 23s: Peter, Rene
Groups: The CCS, Second Venue

Contestants

Key:
 – Winner
 – Runner-up

Live shows
The live shows started on 13 February 2015 at DR Byen. The final will be held at Jyske Bank Boxen in Herning on 27 March.
Colour key

Contestants' colour key:
{|
|-
| – Over 23s (Rafn's contestants)
|-
| – 15-22s (Remee's contestants)
|-
| – Groups (Blachman's contestants)
|}

Live show details

Week 1 (13 February)
Theme: Signature

Judges' votes to eliminate
 Blachman: Jógvan
 Remee: Nanni Klitte
 Rafn: Nanni Klitte – felt the competition was not the right place for her

Week 2 (20 February)
Theme: Grammy nominated hits

Judges' votes to eliminate
 Remee: Finn & Rie – backed his own act, Tannaz Hakami 
 Blachman: Tannaz Hakami – backed his own act, Finn & Rie
 Rafn: Finn & Rie – thought Hakami would get more out of a recording contract

Week 3 (27 February)
Theme: Contemporary hits
Musical guests: Heidi Svelmøe Herløw, Lucas, Asian Senstation, Alien Beat Club, Thomas Ring Petersen, Babou, Tandberg & Østenby, Jean Michel, Karoline, Zaina, Anthony Jasmin, Lucy Mardou and Henriette Haubjerg ("A Sky Full of Stars")

Judges' votes to eliminate
 Remee: Sophia Nohr – backed his own act, Baraa Qadoura
 Rafn: Baraa Qadoura – backed her own act, Sophia
 Blachman: Sophia Nohr

Week 4 (6 March)
Theme: Danish hits

Judges' votes to eliminate
 Rafn: Tannaz Hakami
 Blachman: decided to let Remee decide between his two acts
 Remee: Tannaz Hakami

Week 5 (13 March)
Theme: Songs from Movies (accompanied by DR Bigband)
 Group Performance: "Uptown Funk"

Judges' votes to eliminate
 Blachman: Baraa Qadoura – backed his own act, Ivarsson, Bang & Neumann, and also said to Baraa Qadoura that he never thought a contestant had been sent through after three times in the bottom two
 Remee: Ivarsson, Bang & Neumann – backed his own act, Baraa Qadoura 
 Rafn: Baraa Qadoura – because it was Qadoura's third time in the bottom two

Week 6: Semi-final (20 March)
 Theme: Viewers choice; Judges choice
 Musical guest: Basim ("Picture in a frame") and ("I Believe I Can Fly")

The semi-final did not feature a final showdown and instead the act with the fewest public votes, Citybois, was automatically eliminated.

Week 7: Final (27 March) 
 Theme: Free Choice; Duet with Musical Guests; winner's single
 Musical guests: Ulige Numre ("Halvnøgen"); Julias Moon ("Palace"); Stine Bramsen ("The Day You Leave Me"); OMI ("Cheerleader")
 Group Performances: "Break Free" (Ariana Grande featuring Zedd; Performed of Ivarsson, Bang & Neumann, Emilie Esther, and Jógvan); "Born This Way" (Lady Gaga; (auditionees); "Vi er helte" (Performed of Peter Bjørnskov and X Factor 2015 contestants)

Controversies and criticism
On 25 March, two days before the final, Bente Boserup, leader of BørneTelefonen, criticized the Danish X Factor for exposing children under 18 to high pressure and stress, after contestants Baraa Qadoura and Tannaz Hakami broke down in tears during the fourth live show. This was supported by psychologist John Halse, as well as contestant Finn Irs, who protested by not showing up to the all-stars song during the final live show. Irs stated that the producers were more interested in their contestants showing their emotions, rather than making a musical show. Jan Lagermand Lundme, the contributing editor on DR1, stated that all contestants were checked by a psychologist to see if they were fit to handle the pressure.

References

Season 08
2015 Danish television seasons